Malacoctenus delalandii is a species of labrisomid blenny native to the Atlantic Ocean and the Caribbean Sea from Guatemala to Brazil.  This species is an inhabitant of coral reefs being found in sandy areas and around beds of the seagrass Thalassia testudinum.  It can reach a length of  TL. The specific name honours the French explorer and naturalist Pierre Antoine Delalande (1787-1823), who collected the type.

References

delalandii
Fish of the Caribbean
Fish of Colombia
Fish of Venezuela
Fish described in 1836